Also refer to Chintamani

Span

Demography

Education

 LPS – Lower Primary School
 HPS – Higher Primary School

Religious tourism
Kaivara kshetra, South Westerly 
Kailasagiri and Ambaji Durga cave temple, South Westerly
Lakshmi Venkataramana temple, Alamgiri, Southerly
Murugamulla: Fakhi Shah Wali Dargah and Muktheshwara swami temple, Easterly

References

Taluks of Karnataka
Geography of Chikkaballapur district